Wayne Sevier (July 3, 1941 – October 2, 1999) was an American football coach. He served as an assistant coach for the San Diego Chargers, Washington Redskins, Los Angeles Rams and St. Louis Rams.

He died of a heart attack on October 2, 1999, in San Diego, California at age 58.

References

1941 births
1999 deaths
San Diego State Aztecs football players
San Diego Chargers coaches
Washington Redskins coaches
Los Angeles Rams coaches
St. Louis Rams coaches